Anna Jakubczak (born  in Zamość) is a Polish middle distance runner who specializes in the 1500 metres.

Competition record

Personal bests
800 metres - 2:00.78 min (1999)
1500 metres - 4:00.15 min (2004)
3000 metres - 9:17.75 min (1998)

External links

1973 births
Living people
Polish female middle-distance runners
Athletes (track and field) at the 2000 Summer Olympics
Athletes (track and field) at the 2004 Summer Olympics
Athletes (track and field) at the 2008 Summer Olympics
Olympic athletes of Poland
People from Zamość
Sportspeople from Lublin Voivodeship
Skra Warszawa athletes
20th-century Polish women
21st-century Polish women